The Dr. Albert Henry Byfield House is a historic building located in Iowa City, Iowa, United States. Completed in 1917, the two-story house combines elements of the Tudor Revival and the Craftsman styles. It was designed by Stuart Hobbs Sims, an engineering professor at the University of Iowa. It features asymmetrical facades, a two-story porch on the east elevation, and a tile roof with a cat-slide gable. The first owner of the house, Dr. Byfield, founded the Pediatrics Department at the University of Iowa College of Medicine. The house was listed on the National Register of Historic Places in 2017.

References

Houses completed in 1917
Tudor Revival architecture in Iowa
Houses in Iowa City, Iowa
National Register of Historic Places in Iowa City, Iowa
Houses on the National Register of Historic Places in Iowa